This is an alphabetical list of radio stations in Cape Verde.

List of radio stations

National stations
 RCV - Radio Cabo Verde
 RCV+ - Radio Cabo Verde Jovem - youth network

Regional stations
 Rádio Atlântico
 Praia FM - the first FM station in Cape Verde, based in the capital city
 Rádio Praia - based in the capital city
 Rádio Comunitário do Voz de Ponta d'Água - based in a Praia neighborhood
RCSM - Rádio Comunitaria de Santa Maria - FM 98.0 - based in Sal Island
 Radio Morabeza - Portuguese-speaking radio station with some English programming (93.7 FM for the Barlavento Islands and 90.7 FM for the Sotavento Islands)

Defunct/former stations
 Rádio Barlavento - once broadcast in the Barlavento Islands, aired from 1955 to 1975
 Rádio Clube do Mindelo - once broadcast throughout the island of São Vicente, aired from 1947 to 1955
 Rádio Colonial Portuguesa - existed between the mid 1930s until independence in 1975
 Rádio Voz de São Vicente - once aired from 1975 to the 1990s, replaced with RTC afterwards

International radio stations
RDP África - Portuguese based radio station which includes news and sports from Portugal - availability is on satellite
Radio Cabo Verde International - Radio on line web site http://www.radiocaboverdeinternational.com/

Outside Cape Verde
 Rádio Atlântico - Cape Verdean station broadcast in the Netherlands, based in Rotterdam

See also
 Telecommunications in Cape Verde
 Media of Cape Verde
 List of television stations in Cape Verde